The To the Stars trilogy is a series of science fiction novels by Harry Harrison, first published in 1980 (Homeworld) and 1981 (Wheelworld and Starworld). The three books were re-published in an omnibus edition in 1981.

Homeworld
Homeworld  presents a dystopian world some centuries in the future; in response to the depletion of the world's natural resources and resulting social and environmental collapse, a ruthless totalitarian oligarchy has emerged, ruling over both Earth and the interstellar colonies that have been established. The novel introduces the protagonist of the series, Jan Kulozik, an engineer and member of his society's privileged technocratic elite, and traces his disillusionment and eventual rebellion as he discovers the true nature of his society.

Wheelworld
In Wheelworld Jan Kulozik has been exiled to the agricultural colony world Halvmörk in the Beta Aurigae system. Kulozik must lead the colonists on a hazardous journey across the planet after the re-supply ships from Earth fail to appear on schedule, while coping with the suspicions and maneuverings of Halvmörk's oligarchic rulers.

Halvmörk is the third planet of Beta Aurigae. Like many names in Harrison's work, Halvmörk is taken from a European language, here Swedish. It literally means "half-dark". This may be related to the fact that due to extreme temperature differences human life is possible only in a small twilight zone round the wintry pole.

Halvmörk's orbiting period (year) is a little over eight Earth years. Its orbit is extremely elliptic, and the inclination of its axis is 41°, so seasonal changes have an enormous effect on the weather. The rotational axis is inclined in the direction of the small axis of the orbit, so the periastron and the apastron coincide with the equinoxes.

As a result, the twilight zone remains largely constant for most of the year, when the planet is far from its sun. During this time a colony of humans grows grain in the twilight zone. When the planet approaches its periastron or its apastron the colony migrates to the other pole, using enormous insulated trucks and the planet's sole road, built especially to be used once in four years.

The novel does not seem to take into account that due to the ellipticity of the orbit the planet would be in a near-equinox position during most of the orbiting period, which would mean that both poles would enjoy a mild twilight. If the orbit were less elliptic there would be no arctic twilight zone at all but polar nights and days of varying length, like on Earth. So it is hard to imagine the astronomic circumstances needed for Harrison's interesting plot.

Starworld
In Starworld, the final novel in the trilogy, an interstellar rebellion has overthrown the Earth Empire's control over the interstellar colonies. Kulozik returns to Earth from exile to attempt to spread the revolution to the mother planet itself.

Reception
Greg Costikyan reviewed Homeworld, Wheelworld, and Starworld in Ares Magazine #10 and commented that "Harrison is incapable of writing a bad novel, and To the Stars is a fairly enjoyable way to kill some time."

References

1980 American novels
1981 American novels
Dystopian novels
Novels by Harry Harrison
American science fiction novels
American novel series